Ben or Benjamin Saunders may refer to:

 Ben Saunders (explorer) (born 1977), British polar explorer, endurance athlete, and motivational speaker
 Ben Saunders (fighter) (born 1983), professional mixed martial artist
 Ben Saunders (singer) (born 1983), Dutch winner of season 1 of The Voice of Holland
 Ben Saunders (Holby City), a character in Holby City
 Ben Saunders (English footballer) (born 1984), English footballer
 Ben Saunders (Australian footballer) (born 1991), Australian rules footballer
 Benjamin Saunders (professor) (born 1968), comics expert